Poetry Glacier is a glacier flowing north and northwest into the east side of Venus Bay, north King George Island. So named by the Polish Antarctic Expedition, 1984 [in association with "Milosz Point."] Lodowiec Poezji is the translation of the English name.

See also
 List of glaciers in the Antarctic
 Glaciology

References
 

Glaciers of King George Island (South Shetland Islands)